The Derajat Brigade was formed after the 1903 reforms of the British Indian Army by Herbert Kitchener when he was Commander-in-Chief, India. The brigade was part of the Northern Army and deployed along the North West Frontier. The Derajat Brigade had its winter headquarters at Dera Ismail Khan, and the garrison consisted of a mountain battery, a regiment of Native cavalry, and three regiments of Native infantry. Detachments from these regiments helped to garrison the outposts of Drazinda, Jandola, and Jatta.

In 1914 at the start of World War I the brigade formation was:

Commander Major General George Younghusband. He was succeeded by Brigadier-General Francis John Fowler. By 1917 the commander was Brigadier-General Guy Melfort Baldwin.
35th Scinde Horse
18th Infantry
27th Punjabis
45th Rattray's Sikhs
57th Wilde's Rifles (Frontier Force)
32nd Mountain Battery

References

Bibliography

Brigades of India in World War I
Military units and formations established in 1903